MEO Arena is an indoor sporting arena located in Přerov, Czech Republic. The capacity of the arena is 3,000 people, 1,951 of the places are seated. The arena was built in 1969–1971. It is currently home to the HC ZUBR Přerov ice hockey team. The arena was reconstructed in 2009.

External links 
 Information at the official website

Indoor ice hockey venues in the Czech Republic
Přerov District
Buildings and structures in the Olomouc Region
1971 establishments in Czechoslovakia
Sports venues completed in 1971
20th-century architecture in the Czech Republic